DXRV (103.5 FM), broadcasting as Barangay FM 103.5, is a radio station owned and operated by GMA Network. The station's studio and transmitter are located at GMA Complex, Broadcast Ave., Shrine Hills, Matina, Davao City.

The station was originally launched on March 9, 1996, as Campus Radio 103.5. On July 29, 2002, it was rebranded as 103.5 Wow FM with the slogan Wow! Nindota Ah!. On February 17, 2014, as part of RGMA's brand unification due to rebranding of its flagship station in Manila, the station rebranded as Barangay 103.5.

References

Barangay FM stations
Radio stations in Davao City
Radio stations established in 1996